On a Ride is the debut studio album by the Croatian-Danish bubblegum dance group Hit'n'Hide, released in 1998 on Scandinavian Records and was produced by House of Scandinavia. It features the artist's singles "Sundance", "Partyman", "Book of Love", "World of Dreams", and perhaps the group's most well-known hit, "Space Invaders".

Track listing

Charts

References

External links
 
 

1998 debut albums
Hit'n'Hide albums